Cassop (formerly New Cassop) is a village in County Durham, in England. It has a population of about 500 and is located near the city of Durham. A former mining village, mining is no longer the main occupation of Cassop's inhabitants due to extensive mine closure over the last 30 years.

Formerly this village was in the parish of Kelloe, but like many of the villages in that extensive parish, it broke away during the 19th century in this case to form the parish of Cassop-cum-Quarrington, with the neighbouring village, Quarrington Hill.

Cassop Primary School is believed to have been the first in the UK to generate some of its own electricity with its own wind turbine which was erected in February 1999.

Religious sites 
The church of St. Paul, Cassop cum Quarrington was built in 1868. The stones that were used in its construction were allegedly transported by William Smith, innkeeper of the Half Moon Inn, Quarrington Hill, as he was the only villager to own such a cart to make this possible. It was closed during the 1980s and is now demolished. Services for the parish are held at Bowburn. The churchyard is still used for burials.

References

External links 

 Cassop History Society
 Durham Mining Museum entry on Cassop Colliery

Villages in County Durham